D-comma (majuscule: D̦, minuscule: d̦) is a letter that was part of the Romanian alphabet to represent the sound  or  if it was derived from a Latin d (e.g. , pronounced  came from Latin , day). It was the equivalent of the Cyrillic letters З and Ѕ.

This letter was first introduced by Petru Maior in his 1819 book : "".

In 1844, Ioan Eliade introduced d̦ again, in his magazine , as a substitute for з.

However, the rule would not be fully adopted until later.

Taking the matter in his hands, internal affairs minister Ion Ghica stated on 8 February 1860 that whoever in his order ignored the new transitional alphabet would be fired.

In Moldavia, the transitional alphabet and the letter d̦ was adopted much later. In his grammar, published in Paris in 1865, Vasile Alecsandri adopted this sign instead of з, viewing the comma below d as a small s (d̦ was often pronounced , . This was also the case with ș—ss and ț—ts).

This letter was abandoned in 1904 and is no longer in use.

This letter is part of the Livonian alphabet but is presented with D-cedilla in practice.

Computer encoding
Unicode does not include precomposed characters for D̦ d̦—they must be represented with a combining diacritic, which may not align properly in some fonts. Nevertheless, the sequence of base character + combining diacritic is given a unique name.  Otherwise, the D-cedilla (Ḑ ḑ) is somewhat to be a substitute as part of the Unicode standards because the visual appearance of D-cedilla is identical to D-comma as of the Unicode Consortium code chart for Latin Extended Additional.

See also
S-comma
T-comma

Notes

References 
 Negruzzi, Constantin, in vol. "", Bucharest, 1969.
 Vîrtosu, Emil, Bucharest, 1968.

Latin letters with diacritics
Romanian language
1819 introductions